Xenon tetrafluoride is a chemical compound with chemical formula . It was the first discovered binary compound of a noble gas. It is produced by the chemical reaction of xenon with fluorine:

 Xe + 2  → 

This reaction is exothermic, releasing an energy of 251 kJ/mol.

Xenon tetrafluoride is a colorless crystalline solid that sublimes at 117 °C. Its structure was determined by both NMR spectroscopy and X-ray crystallography in 1963. The structure is square planar, as has been confirmed by neutron diffraction studies. According to VSEPR theory, in addition to four fluoride ligands, the xenon center has two lone pairs of electrons.  These lone pairs are mutually trans.

Synthesis

Xenon tetrafluoride is produced by heating a mixture of xenon and fluorine in a 1:5 molar ratio in a nickel container to 400 °C. Some xenon difluoride and xenon hexafluoride is also produced, where increased temperature or decreased fluorine concentration in the input mixture favors  production, and decreased temperature or increased fluorine concentration favors . The nickel is not a catalyst for this reaction; nickel containers are used because they react with fluorine to form a protective, non-peeling passivation layer of nickel(II) fluoride  on their interior surfaces.

Reactions

Xenon tetrafluoride hydrolyzes at low temperatures to form elemental xenon, oxygen, hydrofluoric acid, and aqueous xenon trioxide.

It is used as a precursor for synthesis of all tetravalent Xe compounds. Reaction with tetramethylammonium fluoride gives tetramethylammonium pentafluoroxenate, which contains the pentagonal  anion. The  anion is also formed by reaction with caesium fluoride:

CsF +  → 

Reaction with bismuth pentafluoride forms the  cation:
  +  → XeF3BiF6

The  cation in the salt XeF3Sb2F11 has been characterized by NMR spectroscopy.

At 400 °C,  reacts with xenon to form :
XeF4 + Xe → 2 XeF2

The reaction of xenon tetrafluoride with platinum yields platinum tetrafluoride and xenon:
XeF4 + Pt → PtF4 + Xe

Applications

Xenon tetrafluoride has few applications. It has been shown to degrade silicone rubber for analyzing trace metal impurities in the rubber.  reacts with the silicone to form simple gaseous products, leaving a residue of metal impurities.

References

External links
 WebBook page for XeF4

Fluorides
Nonmetal halides
Xenon(IV) compounds